The greater bamboo lemur (Hapalemur simus), also known as the broad-nosed bamboo lemur and the broad-nosed gentle lemur, is a species of lemur endemic to the island of Madagascar.

Taxonomy 
Originally described as Hapalemur (Prolemur) simus by John Edward Gray in 1870, it was regarded simply as Hapalemur simus as early as 1880. With the understanding that this species is more closely related to the ring-tailed lemur (Lemur catta) than to the other Hapalemur species, Colin Groves resurrected Prolemur as a full genus in 2001, with this species as its only member. More recent research by Herrera and Dávalos (2016) indicates that the species is sister to all of Hapalemur, and that Lemur is sister to Hapalemur + simus, and that it should remain in Hapalemur.

Description 
They have relatively long tails and long back legs for leaping vertically amongst the trees of their forest habitat.

Predators 
Its only confirmed predators are the fossa and the bush pigs, but raptors are also suspected. Protection from predators, avoiding parasite vectors, and enhanced thermoregulation are three theories that are not mutually exclusive to explain the selection of sleeping location. The fossa hunts the Great bamboo lemurs in large numbers. As a result, the lemurs must maintain a secure sleeping environment, such as tree holes and constructed nests.

Habitat  
Its current range is restricted to southeastern Madagascar, although fossils indicate its former range extended across bigger areas of the island, including as far north as Ankarana. Some notable parts of the current range are the Ranomafana and Andringitra National Parks.

Behavior
Greater bamboo lemurs live in groups of up to 28. Individuals are extremely gregarious. The species may be the only lemur in which the male is dominant, although this is not certain. Because of their social nature, greater bamboo lemurs have at least seven different calls. Males have been observed taking bamboo pith away from females that had put significant effort into opening the bamboo stems. In captivity, greater bamboo lemurs have lived over the age of 17.

Diet 
It feeds almost exclusively on the bamboo species of Cathariostachys madagascariensis, preferring the shoots but also eating the pith and leaves. It is unknown how their metabolism deals with the cyanide found in the shoots. The typical daily dose would be enough to kill humans. Greater bamboo lemurs occasionally consume fungi, flowers, and fruit. Its main food source is bamboo and it is the main reason why it has become critically endangered. Areas with high density of bamboo have major human disturbances, where humans cut or illegally cut down bamboo.

Conservation status 
The greater bamboo lemur (Hapalemur simus), is one of the world's most critically endangered primates, according to the IUCN Red List. Scientists believed that it was extinct, but a remnant population was discovered in 1986. Since then, surveys of south- and central-eastern Madagascar have found about 500 individuals in 11 subpopulations. The home range of the species is likewise drastically reduced. The current range is less than 4 percent of its historic distribution. The reason for the endangerment is climate change and human activities which depleted the primary food source (bamboo).  Greater bamboo lemur is a part of prosimian species, which appeared even before monkeys. This species of lemur is not capable of adapting to the rapidly changing habitat. Human activities and climate change have resulted in the depletion of populations and resulted in a few remaining patches of forest capable of supporting this species. The species is endangered by the following: slash and burn farming, mining, bamboo, and other logging, and slingshot hunting.
It was formerly one of "The World's 25 Most Endangered Primates."

References

External links
 https://web.archive.org/web/20081009034212/http://info.bio.sunysb.edu/rano.biodiv/Mammals/Hapalemur-simus/index.html
 https://web.archive.org/web/20051126205302/http://www.arkive.org/species/GES/mammals/Hapalemur_sinus/more_info.html
 http://www.animalinfo.org/species/primate/hapasimu.htm

Lemurs
Endemic fauna of Madagascar
Mammals of Madagascar
Critically endangered fauna of Africa
Mammals described in 1871
Taxa named by John Edward Gray
EDGE species
Fauna of the Madagascar lowland forests
Fauna of the Madagascar subhumid forests